McNair Nunatak is a small, clearly defined rock exposure in Antarctica, situated  east of the central part of the Masson Range and  south-southeast of Russell Nunatak. It was first seen by R. Dovers during the Australian National Antarctic Research Expeditions southern journey of 1954, and was named by the Antarctic Names Committee of Australia for Richard McNair, a cook at Mawson Station in 1955.

References

Nunataks of Mac. Robertson Land